Silvia Farina Elia and Rita Grande were the defending champions, but Farina Elia did not compete this year. Grande teamed up with Sabine Appelmans and lost in semifinals to Catherine Barclay and Karina Habšudová.

Erika deLone and Nicole Pratt won the title, after Catherine Barclay and Karina Habšudová were forced to retire during the final. The score was 7–6(8–6), 4–3.

Seeds

Draw

Draw

References
 Official Results Archive (ITF)
 Official Results Archive (WTA)

Rosmalen Grass Court Championships
2000 WTA Tour